Tango is an amusement ride design produced by the Dutch company KMG that was introduced in 2002. Most carnivals require riders to be 54 inches (137 cm).

Operation and Design 
The Tango is twenty-three meters high, and it revolves around 3 different axes and has room for twenty-four persons, with eight on each axes.

The Tango is built on one central trailer. The construction time of this attraction amounts 4 to 5 hours with 3 persons.

References

Amusement rides
Upside-down amusement rides
Amusement rides introduced in 2002
2002 establishments in the Netherlands